Vạn Ninh is a rural district of Khánh Hòa province in the South Central Coast region of Vietnam.

Geography
Vạn Ninh is the northernmost district of Khánh Hòa. Vạn Ninh has the following communes, from north to south: Đại Lãnh, Vạn Thọ, Vạn Thạnh, Vạn Phước, Vạn Long, Vạn Bình, Vạn Khánh, Vạn Phú, Vạn Lương, Xuân Sơn, Vạn Hưng and Vạn Thắng. It is bordered to the north by Phú Yên province, and to the south by Ninh Hòa. It contains the easternmost point of mainland Vietnam. East of Vạn Ninh is Vân Phong bay, the East Vietnam Sea, and the Pacific Ocean.

As of 2003 the district had a population of 126,805. The district covers an area of 550 km². The district capital lies at Vạn Giã.

Notable people from Vạn Ninh
Thích Quảng Đức

References

External links
Khánh Hòa

Districts of Khánh Hòa province